Mambazhakkalam is a 2004 Indian Malayalam-language family drama film directed by Joshiy, written by T. A. Shahid and produced by M. Mani. It stars Mohanlal and Shobana, alongside a large supporting cast. The film features original songs composed by M. Jayachandran and background score by S. P. Venkatesh.

Plot
Following his father's tragic suicide, Puramanayil Chandran was forced leave for Abu Dhabi at the young age of 22, to amortise all his father's debts.  The film commences with his mother, Lakshmi, faking an illness to persuade Chandran to come back to India to get him married. Chandran, the eldest son of his family, takes care of his big family including his mother, uncle, aunt, his younger sister and brothers, and their spouses and children. From the money earned during his years of toil in the Persian Gulf region, Chandran has become a successful businessman. Now, he has opened and runs a successful school in the name of his late father.

During his vacation in India, Chandran has an excellent time with his family. However, Chandran's marriage doesn't take place because a suitable bride couldn't be found. Depressed by this, Chandran decides to go back to Abu Dhabi. On his way to the airport, Chandran sees his childhood friend Indira. Chandran's quest to meet Indira becomes unsuccessful and he decides to cancel his trip to Abu Dhabi.

As the plot uncovers, Chandran's love for Indira is realised.  However, Indira is now a single mother of ten-year-old Malu after her ex-husband went to jail. One day Chandran sees Indira and her daughter. Malu does not like Chandran because of her bad experiences with her father. Indira's husband, Dr. Raghuram, is a drug addict and he used to physically abuse his ex-wife and kid. Malu warns Chandran to keep away from her mother.

When Dr. Raghuram is released from the jail, he meets Chandran and warns Chandran not to see Indira again.  However, Chandran meets Indira once again to enquire about Dr. Raghuram. Dr. Raghuram issues another threat against his family. This forces Chandran's siblings and their families to leave him because of this relation. On a rainy night, Malu pays a visit to see Chandran and his mother. On this incident, Malu reveals her past: that Malu is not Indira's daughter.

Malu's mother, who was Dr. Raghuram's first wife, was killed by Dr. Raghuram in front of Indira when the two argued over his new marriage. Indira took Malu and ran away from him. Dr. Raghuram later comes to Indira's house to kill Malu and rape Indira.  However, Chandran arrives in time and rescues Indira. Chandran warns Dr. Raghuram to keep away from Indira and Malu. All the family members reunite after realizing Chandran's love for them and the hard work he had done to give them a good life over the years. In the end, Lakshmi decides to get Chandran married to Indira and she accepts Malu as her own granddaughter.

Cast

Soundtrack
Lyrics by Gireesh puthenchery
 Paranjilla njan... - K. J. Yesudas
 Kandu kandu... - Sujatha Mohan 
 Kantha njanum varam... - M. G. Sreekumar
 Alliyilam kiliye... - M.Jayachandran
 Mampazhakalam... - M.G.Sreekumar

Reception
Mampazhakkalam was released on 4 November 2004. The film got mixed to negative reviews from the public, and ended up as a box-office flop.

References

External links
 

2000s Malayalam-language films
2004 romantic drama films
Films scored by M. Jayachandran
Indian romantic drama films
Indian family films
Films shot in Alappuzha
Films directed by Joshiy